Nacogdoches Independent School District is a public school district based in Nacogdoches, Texas (USA).

In addition to Nacogdoches, the district serves central Nacogdoches County, including the City of Appleby.

In 2009, the school district was rated "academically acceptable" by the Texas Education Agency.

Schools

High School (Grades 9-12)
Nacogdoches High School

Middle Schools (Grades 6-8)
McMichael Middle

Elementary schools

Grades PK-5
Brooks-Jones-Quinn Elementary
Raguet Elementary
Grades K-5
Carpenter Elementary
Fredonia Elementary
Nettie Marshall Elementary
Thomas J. Rusk Elementary
Mike Moss Elementary School

Others
Martin School of Choice (Grades 7-12)
NISD/SFASU Charter Campus (Grades K-5)
Nacogdoches County Alternative Education Co-op (Grades 5-12)

References

External links

Nacogdoches ISD

School districts in Nacogdoches County, Texas